Johan van Dyk (born 23 January 1994) is a South African cricketer. He made his first-class debut for Free State in the 2014–15 Sunfoil 3-Day Cup on 19 February 2015. He made his List A debut for Free State in the 2016–17 CSA Provincial One-Day Challenge on 12 March 2017.

In September 2019, he was named in Free State's squad for the 2019–20 CSA Provincial T20 Cup. In April 2021, he was named in Northern Cape's squad, ahead of the 2021–22 cricket season in South Africa.

References

External links
 

1994 births
Living people
South African cricketers
Free State cricketers
Cricketers from Bloemfontein